The men's dual was an event at the annual UCI Mountain Bike & Trials World Championships. It was held between 2000 and 2001, being replaced by the four-cross event in 2002. Brian Lopes of the United States was the most successful rider with one gold medal and one silver medal.

Medalists

References
Results from the Union Cycliste Internationale's website.

Events at the UCI Mountain Bike & Trials World Championships